This is a list of stratigraphic units in Ontario bearing fossils.

See also

References 
 

Geology of Ontario
Ontario